Staples Canada ULC, operating as Staples (also known in Quebec as Bureau en Gros; formerly known as The Business Depot and later Staples Business Depot), is a Canadian office supply retail chain owned by Sycamore Partners. The corporation is headquartered in Richmond Hill, Ontario. Staples is the largest office supply chain in Canada.

History
The Business Depot Ltd. was founded by Jack Bingleman in 1991, with Staples as a substantial investor, opening Business Depot stores in Ontario and later Atlantic Canada and Bureau en Gros locations in Quebec.  The American counterpart acquired 100% of the Canadian company in 1994. Around this time, the company began to open stores in Western Canada under the Staples: The Office Superstore label, like its U.S. counterpart.

The company later began converting locations in English-speaking markets to a combined brand, tested as Staples: The Business Depot and later rolled out as Staples Business Depot. This conversion was completed in 2001, with Quebec locations retaining Bureau en Gros.

In 2008, the company began shortening its name to "Staples" in English Canada to avoid confusion with rival Office Depot, to provide more commonality with its stores in the U.S. and overseas. This was also done to reduce costs associated with Staples brand merchandise packaging that was made specifically for Canada. In Quebec, products that were previously rebranded Bureau en Gros now remain branded as Staples. This change was "soft launched"; Staples updated the logo as the company reordered supplies to reduce costs associated with a brand change. Older locations still retain the full Staples Business Depot signage. The Business Depot Ltd. remained the legal name of the main Canadian subsidiary until 2008, when the company's name was changed to Staples Canada, Inc. The subsidiary later converted from a regular corporation to an unlimited liability corporation (ULC).

In 2008, Staples acquired Corporate Express, which ran under the banner Staples Business Advantage, catering to larger corporations. It has since been rebranded as Staples Professional.

Since 2008, Staples Canada has acquired different companies - such as Chiswick, introducing industrial products to their selection. They have increased their focus on drop-shipping some products to be able to offer a wider selection of merchandise without needing to increase personal inventory or warehouse space.

David Boone was appointed Chief Executive Officer of Staples Canada ULC in January 2018.

In 2017, Staples was acquired by private equity firm Sycamore Partners for $6.9 billion. Under the new owner, Staples Inc. was split into three "independently managed and capitalized" entities; Staples Canada serves as one of these entities, alongside Staples North American Delivery and Staples U.S. Retail.

In December 2018, Staples Canada unveiled a new logo, and the new slogan "Work. Learn. Grow". The rebranding was accompanied by a new store concept, which first launched in Montreal and at its 375 University Avenue flagship store in Toronto. They feature demo areas with curated selections from various product lines (including pens, paper, journals, and consumer electronics), the "Solution Shop" for print and marketing services, and the latter featuring "Staples Studio" co-working areas and an auditorium-style "Spotlight" theatre (which can be rented for sessions and events). With the new concept, Staples Canada began to position itself as "the working and learning company".

References

Staples Inc.
Canadian brands
Office supply companies of Canada
Companies based in Richmond Hill, Ontario
Retail companies established in 1991
Canadian companies established in 1991
Canadian subsidiaries of foreign companies
1991 establishments in Ontario